Karonga North West is a constituency for the National Assembly of Malawi, located in the Karonga District of Malawi's Northern Region. It elects one Member of Parliament by the first past the post system. The constituency is currently represented by Democratic Progressive Party MP James Bond Kamwambi.

Election results

References

Constituencies of the National Assembly of Malawi